Sriram Parthasarathy is a Carnatic Classical Vocalist and a renowned  playback singer .  He hails from a family of Classical Musicians.

Discography
Sriram Parthasarathy is a disciple of Neyveli Santhanagopalan.
He has recorded several singles and released them in the classical genre. He has also recorded many film songs as well for many Veteran music directors like Ilayaraja, A. R. Rahman, Vidyasagar, Harris Jayaraj and Deva. He has also won awards for his beautiful renditions.

Sriram's ultimate hits have been "Aanandha Yazhai" from the movie Thanga Meengal has won National award for its lyrics, Elangathu Veesudhe from the movie Pithamagan and Suttum Vizhi Choodare from Ghajini.

Sriram received appreciations for his rendition in 'Shades of Blue: A Musical Tribute to Venmurasu' sung along with Kamal Haasan, Saindhavi, Rajan Somasundaram and is considered among his career best.

Sriram's Awards, Achievements and Titles
 BEST SINGER AWARD from the Music Academy
 BEST CONCERT AWARD from the Music Academy
 YUVA KALA JYOTHI from [[Nada Veda Mahothsavam Trust.(Chennai)
 TAMIL NADU STATE AWARD from the Chief Minister Kalaignar.Dr.K. Karunanidhi for the song Suttrum Vizhi Chudare from the film Gajini
 INTERNATIONAL JURY AWARD from ITFA group from KualaLampur, Malaysia.
 SARASWATHI SANGEETHA SEVA RATHNA from Saraswathi Sabha (Kumbakonam)
 BEST SINGER from The Lions Club
 MOST POPULAR CINE SONG AWARD from Shivaji Awards (Chennai)
 BEST SINGER from Radio Mirchi Hyderabad.
2005 – Tamil Nadu State Film Award for Best Male Playback – Suttrum Vizhi Choodare – Ghajini
2014 – 61st Filmfare Awards South for Best Male Playback – "Anandha Yaazhai" – Thanga Meenkal
2014– SIIMA Award for Best Male Playback Singer – "Aananda Yaazhai" – Thangameengal

References

Tamil playback singers
Living people
Tamil Nadu State Film Awards winners
Telugu playback singers
Filmfare Awards South winners
1976 births
Indian male playback singers